The Blackburn House is a historic house at 220 North Fourth Street in Rogers, Arkansas.  It is a -story wood-frame structure, set on a stone foundation, with a busy roofline typical of Late Victorian styling, but with more stylistically Classical Revival features, such as turned columns supporting its wraparound porch.  The house was built in 1907 by J. A. C. Blackburn, a lumber baron who controlled much of the timber industry in northwestern Arkansas.  Blackburn built the house as a showcase for his wood products.

The house was listed on the National Register of Historic Places in 1988.

See also
National Register of Historic Places listings in Benton County, Arkansas

References

Houses on the National Register of Historic Places in Arkansas
Neoclassical architecture in Arkansas
Houses completed in 1907
Houses in Rogers, Arkansas
National Register of Historic Places in Benton County, Arkansas
1907 establishments in Arkansas